What's New? is an album by jazz saxophonist Sonny Rollins, his second for RCA Victor  featuring performances by Rollins with Jim Hall, Bob Cranshaw, Ben Riley, Dennis Charles, Frank Charles, Willie Rodriguez and Candido. The cover illustration was by Mike Ludlow.

Reception

The Allmusic review by Scott Yanow states: "This underrated music is well worth an extensive search."

Track listing
All compositions by Sonny Rollins except as indicated
 "If Ever I Would Leave You" (Alan Jay Lerner, Frederick Loewe) – 11:58  
 "Jungoso" – 10:51  
 "Bluesongo" – 4:41  
 "The Night Has a Thousand Eyes" (Buddy Bernier, Jerry Brainin) – 9:08  
 "Brown Skin Girl" (Norman Span) – 6:48  
Recorded in New York City on April 5 (track 4), 25 (track 1), 26 (track 5) and May 14 (tracks 2 & 3), 1962

The album was released in the UK (SF 7524 and RD 7524) and in Japan (SHP-5120) with an alternative opening track, "Don't Stop the Carnival", also a Rollins original. (In France and Germany both versions were available.)

Personnel
Sonny Rollins – tenor saxophone
Jim Hall – guitar (tracks 1, 4 & 5)
Bob Cranshaw – bass 
Ben Riley – drums (tracks 1, 4 & 5) 
Denis Charles, Frank Charles, Willie Rodriguez – percussion (tracks 1, 4 & 5)
Candido – percussion (tracks 2 & 3)

Re-issue
In 1978 RCA reissued this album under the title "Pure Gold Jazz" (ANL1-2809) with the same track listing. Otherwise What's New remained the title throughout its release history. 
In 1993 What's New was first released digitally mastered on CD, despite its short running time without any additional tracks. A year later BMG France reissued the album with both alternative opening tracks.

References

1962 albums
RCA Victor albums
Sonny Rollins albums
albums produced by George Avakian